Dikungu Airport  is a highway strip airport serving the village of Dikungu in Sankuru Province, Democratic Republic of the Congo.

See also

 Transport in the Democratic Republic of the Congo
 List of airports in the Democratic Republic of the Congo

References

External links
 OpenStreetMap - Dikungu Airport
 FallingRain - Dikungu Airport
 OurAirports - Dikungu Airport
 

Airports in Sankuru